Tagiades parra is a species of spread-winged skipper butterflies in the genus Tagiades. It is found from Sikkim and Assam to Indochina and all throughout maritime Southeast Asia. The species was first described by the German entomologist Hans Fruhstorfer in 1910 as a subspecies of Tagiades gana. The type specimens were collected from Kota Kinabalu, Malaysia. The species name is from Latin parra, a supernatural bird (usually an owl or a crow) bringing ill omen.

It has since been recognized as a separate species and four subspecies are included under it:
Tagiades parra gala Evans, 1949
Tagiades parra naxos Evans, 1949
Tagiades parra niasana Mabille & Boullet, 1916
Tagiades parra parra Fruhstorfer, 1910

Tagiades parra can be distinguished from other species of Tagiades by the absence of hyaline spots in space 11 over the cell spot, and spaces 2 and 3 in the forewings. A dark spot on space 6 on the upper side of the hindwing is closer to the edges (termen) than to the origin of vein 7. The hind tibiae of males also lack hair pencils.

References

Tagiades
Butterflies described in 1910
Butterflies of Indochina